Eakin Creek Canyon Provincial Park is a provincial park in British Columbia, Canada, located on the west side of the North Thompson River near the community of Little Fort.  The park is approximately 10 ha. in size.

See also
Eakin Creek Floodplain Provincial Park

References
"Eakin Creek Canyon Park"

Provincial parks of British Columbia
Thompson Country
Canyons and gorges of British Columbia
Year of establishment missing